Dayton Township is one of seventeen townships in Cedar County, Iowa, USA.  As of the 2000 census, its population was 1,282.

Geography
According to the USGS, it contains four cemeteries: Clarence, Dayton Valley, Onion Grove (historical) and Saint Johns.

References

External links
 US-Counties.com
 City-Data.com

Townships in Cedar County, Iowa
Townships in Iowa